is a Japanese former football player. He played for Japan national team. He was a forward and known as an opportunistic goal-scorer, making most of his quick thinking and canny positioning. He currently works at Nippon Television and belongs to an entertainment agency Horipro as a sportscaster. Takeda is also an influential businessman and player agent in Japanese.

Club career
Takeda was educated at and played for Shimizu Higashi High School. He joined Japan Soccer League side Yomiuri in 1986. When Japan's first professional league J1 League started in 1993, Yomiuri was transformed to Verdy Kawasaki for whom he continued to play. His partnership with Kazuyoshi Miura up front was one of the key elements that brought successes to the club in the late 1980s and early 1990s. He was transferred to Júbilo Iwata for the 1996 season but came back to Verdy (1997), then moved to Kyoto Purple Sanga (July 1997-December 1997), JEF United Ichihara (1998–1999), again Verdy (2000), Paraguayan side Sportivo Luqueño (June 2000-December 2000), where he made two appearances for the club under coach Raul Vicente Amarilla, and finished his playing career at Verdy (2001).

National team career
Takeda played 18 times for the Japanese national team between 1987 and 1994. He made his international debut on April 8, 1987 in a 1988 Summer Olympics qualification against Indonesia at the Tokyo National Stadium. He scored his sole international goal in the match. He was a member of the Japan team that won the 1992 Asian Cup but he did not play in the tournament.

Under national coach Hans Ooft, Japan reached the 1994 World Cup qualification final stage for the 1994 World Cup. He was on the pitch, after replacing Masashi Nakayama in the 81st minute, when Japan's hope to play in the finals in the USA was dashed by an injury-time Iraqi equaliser in the last qualifier, the match that the Japanese fans now refer to as the Agony of Doha.

Club statistics

National team statistics

Honors and awards

Team honors
 1992 Asian Cup (Champions)

Video games
 Takeda Nobuhiro no Super Cup Soccer - Super Famicom videogame, released November 26, 1993
 Takeda Nobuhiro no Ace Striker - Game Boy videogame, released February 18, 1994
 Takeda Nobuhiro no Super League Soccer - Super Famicom videogame, released November 25, 1994

References

External links
 
 
 Japan National Football Team Database
  

1967 births
Living people
Association football people from Shizuoka Prefecture
Japanese footballers
Japan international footballers
Japan Soccer League players
J1 League players
Tokyo Verdy players
Júbilo Iwata players
Kyoto Sanga FC players
JEF United Chiba players
Sportivo Luqueño players
Japanese expatriate footballers
Japanese expatriate sportspeople in Paraguay
Expatriate footballers in Paraguay
Footballers at the 1990 Asian Games
1992 AFC Asian Cup players
AFC Asian Cup-winning players
Association football forwards
Asian Games competitors for Japan
Footballers at the 1994 Asian Games